Braux-Saint-Remy is a commune (municipality) in the Marne department in northeastern France. Braux-Saint-Remy is the only village in the commune. The nearest town is Sainte-Menehould at a distance of 10 km.

Population

See also
 Communes of the Marne department

References

Communes of Marne (department)